John Walker is an Australian actor who appeared in the sketch comedy show Full Frontal (1994–97) and its successor Totally Full Frontal (1998–99). His most notable characters in the series were sleazy news presenter Ian Goodings, and his impersonation of John Howard, the Prime Minister of Australia at the time. Walker also made appearances in the 1999 comedy film The Craic, the Australian drama Blue Heelers and the Australian comedy Pizza.

Walker later worked as a teacher in regional Australia.

References

External links

Australian male television actors
Australian male comedians
Living people
Year of birth missing (living people)